Courtney Babcock may refer to:

Courtney Babcock-Key athlete
the elder sister of Norman voiced by Anna Kendrick in 2012 film ParaNorman